Åfjord is a municipality in Trøndelag county, Norway. It is part of the Fosen region. The administrative centre of the municipality is the village of Årnes. Other villages in the municipality include Revsnes, Roan, Bessaker, Harsvika, and By. Åfjord is located on the northwestern side of the Fosen peninsula, northwest of the city of Trondheim. It is located between the municipalities of Ørland and Osen and to the west of Steinkjer, with Indre Fosen to the south.

The  municipality is the 74th largest by area out of the 356 municipalities in Norway. Åfjord is the 196th most populous municipality in Norway with a population of 4,252.

General information

The municipality of Aafjord was established on 1 January 1838 (see formannskapsdistrikt law). On 26 March 1870, a royal resolution moved a small, unpopulated part to Aafjord to the neighboring municipality of Bjugn. On 1 January 1896, the southwestern coastal area of Aafjord (population: 1,529) was separated to form the new municipality of Jøssund. This left Aafjord with 2,419 residents. On the same date, the name of Aafjord municipality was changed to just Aa. The spelling was later changed to Å. On 13 July 1934, the name of the municipality was changed from "Å" to "Åfjord". After that, the administrative centre in the municipality was referred to as "Å" or "Å i Åfjord".

During the 1960s, there were many municipal mergers across Norway due to the work of the Schei Committee. On 1 January 1964, the neighboring municipalities of Stoksund (population: 2,643) and Åfjord (population: 1,515) to form the new, larger municipality of Åfjord.  On 1 November 1980, the postal service changed the name of the municipal center from "Å i Åfjord" to "Årnes".

On 1 January 2018, the municipality switched from the old Sør-Trøndelag county to the new Trøndelag county.

On 1 January 2020, the neighboring municipalities of Roan and Åfjord merged into one large municipality called Åfjord. The new municipality uses the coat of arms of the old Roan municipality.

Name
The municipality (originally the parish) is named after the old Aa farm since the first Åfjord Church was built there. The local fjord (Åfjorden) is also named after this farm. The name has varied over the years: Aafjord (1838 to 1896), then Aa or Å (1896 to 1934), and finally Åfjord (since 1934).

Coat of arms

The current coat of arms was approved for use starting on 1 January 2020 after a municipal merger with Åfjord and Roan municipalities. These arms had previously been used by Roan from 1987 until 2020. The official blazon is "Azure, three terns volant argent". This means the arms have a blue field (background) and the charge is a group of three flying terns. The bird design has a tincture of argent which means it is commonly colored white, but if it is made out of metal, then silver is used. Terns, a very watchful and energetic bird, are intended to symbolize the local inhabitants and the coast with the vast bird life in the area. The arms were initially designed by Solfrid Krogfjord with the final design by Einar H. Skjervold. The municipal flag has the same design as the coat of arms. 

The previous coat of arms was granted on 18 April 1997 until 1 January 2020 when the municipality was enlarged and the arms were changed. The official blazon is "Azure, two boats argent issuant from sinister". This means the arms have a blue field (background) and the charge is two boats coming out of the right side of the shield. The boats have a tincture of argent which means they are commonly colored white, but if the arms are made out of metal, then silver is used. The arms show two stems of a boat to represent the special boats  that are built in the municipality. These boats had a long, shallow keel and straight masts. The arms were designed by Einar H. Skjervold. The municipal flag had the same design as the coat of arms.

Churches
The Church of Norway has three parishes within the municipality of Åfjord. It is part of the Fosen prosti (deanery) in the Diocese of Nidaros.

History

There are archeological findings on many sites across the municipality. On Dragseid archaeologists have located grave mounds. On Dragseid it is said that the wooden boats were dragged over this thin peninsula to shorten the journey and to avoid risking them in bad weather. Up to the Middle Ages the Fosen peninsula was included as a part of the district of Nordmøre, immediately to the south.

Prior to 1950, there were no roads leading into and out of the municipality. In 1950, the road to the neighboring municipality of Bjugn to the south was finally finished. In 1955, the road to Stokksund in the northern part of the municipality was finished.

An old type of wooden boat, the Åfjord boat, comes from this area. The boat is a direct descendant form the old Norse Viking boats. It is still being produced, although in very small numbers. The boat is rounded at both ends. It is known to be a good coastal sailer. Different sizes exist. From the small "faering" to the largest of them all, the "fembøring".

Government
All municipalities in Norway, including Åfjord, are responsible for primary education (through 10th grade), outpatient health services, senior citizen services, unemployment and other social services, zoning, economic development, and municipal roads. The municipality is governed by a municipal council of elected representatives, which in turn elect a mayor.  The municipality falls under the Trøndelag District Court and the Frostating Court of Appeal.

Municipal council
The municipal council of Åfjord is made up of 27 representatives that are elected to four year terms. The party breakdown of the council is as follows:

Mayors
The mayors of Åfjord:

1838–1839: Thore Petter Berg
1840–1847: Hans Günther Magelsen 
1848–1851: Thore Petter Berg 	
1852–1853: Christopher Andreas Lassen 
1854–1857: Thore Petter Berg
1858–1859: Christopher Andreas Lassen 
1860–1867: Ole Berg 
1868–1871: Bernt Graning 
1872–1877: Ole Berg
1878–1879: Hans P. Dahl (V)
1880–1885: Nils Berg 
1886–1890: Karl Seip (V)
1890–1898: Hans P. Dahl (V)
1899–1907: Ove Selnes (V)
1908–1919: Ole Berdahl (V)
1920–1928: Kristian Karlsaune (V)
1929–1931: Johannes Bye (H)
1932–1937: Ole O. Stjern (Bp)
1938–1942: Einar Nordtømme (Bp)
1942–1945: Magne Nilsen (NS)
1945–1946: Einar Nordtømme (Bp)
1947–1955: Petter M. Stavrum (Bp)
1955-1955: Toralf Gilde (Sp)
1956–1965: Einar Hole Moxnes (Sp)
1966–1967: Erling Stjern (KrF)
1968–1971: John Skaseth (Sp)
1972–1975: Erling Stjern (KrF)
1976–1989: Einar Aune (Sp)
1990–1995: Michael Momyr (H)
1995–1998: Kristian Flenstad (Sp)
1998–1999: Vidar Daltveit (KrF)
1999–2007: Oddbjørn Rømma (Sp)
2007–present: Vibeke Stjern (Ap)

Economy
The people of Åfjord make their living from agriculture, forestry, fishing, transport (sea and land), aquaculture (fish and shellfish), construction, and services. The largest employer in the area is Stjern (forestry, sawmill, entrepreneur). The contractor, building, sector now employs about 19% of the working force, and is now larger than the agricultural sector.

Geography

The major centre of the municipality is Årnes (also called "Å in Åfjord"). All major services of the municipality are located there. During the last decades there has been a decrease of 100-150 people yearly. Many young people leave the municipality for school, university or work.

Åfjord consists of many small settlements—from the islands in the west to the highlands in the east. Traditionally, Åfjord has been an agricultural society, while Stoksund in the west has had a more of a fishing-based economy. There is an increasing amount of weekend houses and recreational cabins in the area. Åfjord has two big islands; Stokkøya (380 inhabitants) and Linesøya (80 inhabitants). Stokkøya is connected with the mainland through a bridge Stokkøy Bridge. The Linesøy Bridge connects the islands of Stokkøya and Linesøya. The other main island is Lauvøya near the south at the end of the Åfjorden.

There are over 1,000 lakes with fish. Åfjord also has two major salmon rivers—the Nordalselva and Stordalselva, which flow into Åfjorden. English Lords used to fish here in the late 19th century. The lake Stordalsvatnet lies just east of Årnes. The lake Straumsetervatnet lies in the east, along the border with Verran.

Notable people 
 Johan Strand Johansen (1903 in Åfjord - 1970 in Moscow) politician, role in the Furubotn purge
 Einar Hole Moxnes (1921–2006) a Norwegian politician, Mayor of Åfjord 1955 to 1966
 Hans B. Skaset (born 1935) a Norwegian civil servant and sports official
 Michael Momyr (born 1956) a Norwegian politician, Mayor of Åfjord 1990 to 1995
 Alexander Lund Hansen (born 1982 in Åfjord) a Norwegian former football goalkeeper

References

External links

Municipal fact sheet from Statistics Norway 
Abstract:The biological diversity of Åfjord

 
Municipalities of Trøndelag
1838 establishments in Norway